Anatol Cheptine (born 20 May 1990) is a footballer who played as a midfielder for Fortuna Liga club MFK Ružomberok. He also played for Zimbru Chișinău in the Divizia Naţională and the Moldova national football team. He most recently played for Dinamo-Auto Tiraspol.

Club career

FC Sheriff
In 2007, he signed for local Moldovan club FC Sheriff however he failed to make an appearance instead representing the reserve team where he made 4 appearances scoring 1 goal.

FC Tiraspol
In late 2007 he moved to rival club FC Tiraspol where he featured prominently over several years.

Return to FC Sheriff
In 2011, he made his return to FC Sheriff and managed 4 goals in 10 games in his first season.

International career
On 29 March 2011 he made his debut for the Moldova national football team in a UEFA Euro 2012 qualifying match against Sweden.

Honours
Sheriff Tiraspol
Divizia Națională: 2011–12

FC Tiraspol
Moldovan Cup: 2012–13

Zimbru Chișinău
Moldovan Cup (1): 2013–14
Moldovan Super Cup (1): 2014

References

External links

1990 births
Living people
People from Tiraspol
Moldovan footballers
Moldova international footballers
Moldova youth international footballers
FC Sheriff Tiraspol players
FC Zimbru Chișinău players
FC Tiraspol players
Association football midfielders
FC Academia Chișinău players
MFK Ružomberok players
MFK Dolný Kubín players
Slovak Super Liga players
2. Liga (Slovakia) players
Expatriate footballers in Slovakia
Moldovan expatriate sportspeople in Slovakia
FC Florești players
Moldovan Super Liga players